Nanerigé is a Senufo language spoken in south-western Burkina Faso.

References

Languages of Burkina Faso
Suppire–Mamara languages